The Conquest of Ran Wei by Former Yan or Wei-Yan war was a conflict in North China in 352 CE between the Former Yan, composed of mixed Xianbei-Han forces, and the Ran Wei. It ended in Yan victory, bringing about the downfall of the Ran Wei regime and the rise of brief Xianbei rule in North China.

Background

In 350 CE, Ran Min restored native Han rule to North China and issued a cull order, starting the Wei-Jie war. As a result, thousands of Wu Hu (:zh:胡人) were killed, and their uprisings suppressed with the exception of the Xianbei tribe in Northeast China. In 352 CE, the Murong Xianbei attacked Ran Wei with generals and soldiers from both Xianbei and Han backgrounds.

Course of the war

Although initially successful, the Ran Wei army was ambushed by the Former Yan forces, who used Xianbei heavy cavalry to charge into Wei infantry lines. Ran Min himself was captured after single handedly killing more than a hundred enemy soldiers.

When asked why he had usurped Later Zhao, Ran Min replied: "If beastly barbarians like you can be emperor, why not me, a heroic descendant of the Huaxia!" 

Murong Jun was furious that Ran insulted him as a barbarian and ordered Ran to be executed.

Aftermath

With the fall of Ran Wei, Xianbei forces controlled much of North China, until the rise of the Liu Song dynasty almost a century later.

References

Sources
Li, Bo; Zheng Yin (2001) 5000 years of Chinese history, Inner Mongolian People's publishing corp,  [in Chinese]

Jin dynasty (266–420)